Chahar Gah (also Romanized as Chahār Gāh; also known as Chahār Gāv, Chuār Gao, and Chūār Gā’ū) is a village in Yalghuz Aghaj Rural District, Serishabad District, Qorveh County, Kurdistan Province, Iran. At the 2006 census, its population was 78, in 18 families. The village is populated by Kurds.

References 

Towns and villages in Qorveh County
Kurdish settlements in Kurdistan Province